Santiago de Cali, or Cali, is the capital of the Valle del Cauca department in Colombia.

Cali may also refer to:

Populated places
 Cali, an informal short form of the name of the American state of California

Entertainment
 Cali (singer), stage name of French singer Bruno Caliciuria
 Cali & El Dandee, a Colombian pop duo comprising Alejandro Rengifo (Cali) and Mauricio Rengifo (Dandee)
 Cali Chronic or Cali, a single released by American rap group Harlem World
 Cali Gari, a Japanese experimental rock band

Other uses
 Calì, a list of people with the surname or given Calì
 Alfonso Bonilla Aragón International Airport or Cali Airport, in Columbia
 Cali cartel, a drug cartel
 Cali River in western Colombia
 Center for Computer-Assisted Legal Instruction (CALI), a nonprofit US law school consortium

See also

 Cari (disambiguation)
 Kali, a Hindu goddess